There have been four baronetcies created for members of the Thorold (pronounced "Thurrald", though the late Revd. Henry Croyland Thorold was insistent on the pronunciation "Thorough") family of Lincolnshire, two in the Baronetage of England and two in the Baronetage of Great Britain. As of 2014 one creation is extant.

The Thorold Baronetcy, of Marston in the County of Lincoln, was created in the Baronetage of England on 24 August 1642 for William Thorold. He fought as a Royalist in the Civil War and represented Grantham in the House of Commons after the Restoration. The fourth Baronet sat as Member of Parliament for Grantham and Lincolnshire. The ninth Baronet was Member of Parliament for Lincolnshire. The tenth Baronet was a noted book collector. The twelfth Baronet represented Grantham in Parliament. The fifteenth Baronet was a captain in the Royal Navy and leader of the Lincolnshire County Council. As of 28 February 2014 the present Baronet has not successfully proven his succession and is therefore not on the Official Roll of the Baronetage, with the baronetcy considered dormant since 1999.

The family first came to Marston through the marriage of Sir Richard Thorold with the heiress of the de Marston family in the middle of the fourteenth century, in the middle of the fourteenth century, The Right Reverend Anthony Wilson Thorold, son of Reverend Edward Thorold, fourth son of the ninth Baronet, was Bishop of Rochester and Bishop of Winchester.

The family seat was at Syston Park, near South Kesteven, Lincolnshire.

The Thorold Baronetcy, of Hough-on-the-Hill in the County of Lincoln, was created in the Baronetage of England on 14 June 1644 for Robert Thorold. The title became extinct on the death of the third Baronet in 1706.

The Thorold Baronetcy, of Harmston in the County of Lincoln, was created in the Baronetage of Great Britain on 9 September 1709 for George Thorold. The title became extinct on the death of the second Baronet in 1738.

The Thorold Baronetcy, of Harmston in the County of Lincoln, was created in the Baronetage of Great Britain on 14 March 1740 for Nathaniel Thorold; he was the nephew of the baronets of the 1709 creation. The title became extinct on his death in 1764.

Thorold baronets, of Marston (1642)

Sir William Thorold, 1st Baronet (–1678)
Sir William Thorold, 2nd Baronet (c. 1659 – c. 1681)
Sir Anthony Thorold, 3rd Baronet (c. 1663 – 1685)
Sir John Thorold, 4th Baronet (c. 1664 – 1717)
Sir William Thorold, 5th Baronet (died )
Sir Anthony Thorold, 6th Baronet (c. 1710 – 1721)
Sir John Thorold, 7th Baronet (1675–1748)
Sir John Thorold, 8th Baronet (1703–1775)
Sir John Thorold, 9th Baronet (1734–1815)
Sir John Hayford Thorold, 10th Baronet (1773–1831)
Sir John Charles Thorold, 11th Baronet (1816–1866)
Sir John Henry Thorold, 12th Baronet (1842–1922)
Sir John George Thorold, 13th Baronet (1870–1951)
Sir James Ernest Thorold, 14th Baronet (1877–1965)
Sir Anthony Henry Thorold, 15th Baronet (1903–1999)
Sir Anthony Oliver Thorold, 16th Baronet (born 1945)

The heir apparent is the present holder's son Henry Lowry Thorold (born 1981).

Thorold baronets, of Hough-on-the-Hill (1644)
Sir Robert Thorold, 1st Baronet (died c. 1660)
Sir Robert Thorold, 2nd Baronet (died c. 1695)
Sir Robert Thorold, 3rd Baronet (died 1706)

Thorold baronets, of Harmston (1709)
Sir George Thorold, 1st Baronet (c. 1666 – 1722)
Sir Samuel Thorold, 2nd Baronet (died 1738)

Thorold baronets, of Harmston (1740)
Sir Nathaniel Thorold, 1st Baronet (died 1764)

References

Kidd, Charles & Williamson, David (editors). Debrett's Peerage and Baronetage (1990 edition). New York: St Martin's Press, 1990.

External links
Article (2004) on Thorold family at The Thorold (Ontario) and Beaverdams Historical Society website

 
Baronetcies created with special remainders
Baronetcies in the Baronetage of England
Extinct baronetcies in the Baronetage of England
Extinct baronetcies in the Baronetage of Great Britain
Grantham
1642 establishments in England
1709 establishments in Great Britain